Biliński - is a Polish coat of arms. It was used by the szlachta Biliński family.

History

Blazon

Related coat of arms 
 Sas coat of arms

Notable bearers

Notable bearers of this coat of arms include:
 Leon Biliński - University president of Jan Kazimierz University in Lwów, Treasury Minister
 Anna Bilińska-Bohdanowicz - painter
 Janina Bilińska-Morcinek - painter
 Roman Biliński - painter

See also 
 Polish heraldry
 Heraldic family
 List of Polish nobility coats of arms

Bibliography
 Tadeusz Gajl: Herbarz polski od średniowiecza do XX wieku : ponad 4500 herbów szlacheckich 37 tysięcy nazwisk 55 tysięcy rodów. L&L, 2007. .

External links 
 Dynastic Genealogy 
 Ornatowski.com 

Polish coats of arms
Ruthenian noble families